, also known as Tono2097, is a Japanese video game sound designer, audio engineer, composer, YouTuber, and musician, and is currently an instructor at HAL Osaka, a vocational school in Osaka, Japan.

He is best known for sound design for the Resident Evil video game series, and his YouTube channel. Utsumi is also one half of the musical duo mT with Tanaka Hit, playing both the keyboard and the band's own creation, the MIDI stick, created from arcade-game controllers.

Utsumi worked in Capcom's sound design department for 14 years. He left in 2009 to teach at HAL Osaka College of Technology & Design.

He is married to former Capcom colleague Saori Maeda, who co-composed the soundtrack of Resident Evil 3: Nemesis with Masami Ueda.

Birds
In 2021, a video recorded and uploaded to Instagram of Gumi, a pet chattering lory owned by Utsumi, became popular on the Internet, forming the basis of an Internet meme. Within weeks of the video being published, Utsumi's YouTube channel would surpass 200,000 subscribers and accrue over 10 million channel views.

In addition to Gumi, Utsumi owns three other birds: Lemon, a white-bellied parrot; Kiwi, a harlequin macaw; and Kohaku, a white cockatoo. Utsumi also had a black lory named Kuromi, who died of unknown causes on September 15, 2021.

List of works
Resident Evil (1996)
Resident Evil 2 (1998)
El Dorado Gate (2000)
Devil May Cry (2001)
Clock Tower 3 (2002)
Resident Evil (GameCube remake) (2002)
Mega Man X: Command Mission (2004)
Glass Rose (2004)
Haunting Ground (2005)
Resident Evil: Deadly Silence (2006)
Mega Man Powered Up (2006)
Resident Evil 5 (2009)

Discography
V.A. / KIVANDELYAN (1996)
V.A. / - natsu - (1997)
mT / Daydream (1999)
GAME OVER
u-man's diary -awaji-

References

External links

Tono2097 at personal web
WorkShop at capcom sound sphere (Japanese)
marth TERIT RECORDS. at music ravel
ORIGINAL SOUND VERSION at videogame music website

1973 births
Capcom people
Japanese composers
Japanese male composers
Living people
Video game composers